Below is list of Italian language exonyms for places in non-Italian-speaking areas of the world

Albania

Algeria

Australia

Austria

Bangladesh

Belgium

Brazil

Bulgaria

Burkina Faso

Canada

Chile

China

Comoros

Côte d'Ivoire (Ivory Coast)

Croatia

For Italian language exonyms in Istria, see : Italian exonyms (Istria)
For Italian language exonyms in Dalmatia, see : Italian exonyms (Dalmatia)

These Italian names are not full exonyms, since they are used by the autochthonous Italian population.

Cuba

Cyprus

Czech Republic

Denmark

Djibouti

Egypt

Eritrea

Ethiopia

France
Italian was the official language of Corsica, the County of Nice, and Savoy until 1859–1861.

Bapaume Bapalma
Bar Bar, Bario
Bar-le-Duc Bario il Duca
Barcelonnette Barcellonetta / Barciloneta (old)
Barege Baregio
Barjols Bargiolio
Bayeux Baioca, Bajoce (old) 
Bayonne Baiona
Bazas Basate, Basato
Béarn Bearne, Bearnia, Bearno
Beaucaire Belcaro (old)
Beauce Belsia
Beaujeu Belgiuoco
Beaujolais Belloiese
Beaune Beona / Belna (old)
Beauvais Bovesia, Bellovaco (old)
Belgodère Belgodere (the Italian form being the original)
Belley Bellei
Bergerac Bergherago
Berry Berri, Beri, Bituria
Besançon Besanzone, Bisanzone
Béziers Besiera
Bigorre Bigorra
Bouches de Bonifacio Bocche di Bonifacio (the Italian form being the original)
Blaye Blaia, Blavia
Blois Blesa
Bordeaux Bordò / Bordea, Bordeo, Bordella (old)
Boulogne-sur-Mer Bologna di mare, Bologna a mare, Bulogna 
Bourbonnais Borbonese, Burbonese (old)
Bourges Borge / Borghi (old)
Bourg-en-Bresse Borgo in Bressia / Borgonbrescia (very old)
Bresse Bressia / (Brescia)- [hist. – rare]
Brest Bresta, Bresto (old)
Bourgogne Borgogna
Briançon Brianzone, Briganzone (old)
Bretagne Bretagna, Brettagna
Brie Brigia, Bregia
Brignoles Brignolle
Brioude Brioda (old)
Brive-la-Gaillarde Briva-La Gagliarda (old)
Caen Cadomo (old)
Cahors Caorsa / Cadurco (old)
Calais Calesia, Calesse, Caleto / Calei
Cambrai Cameraco / Camaraco (old)
Cannes Canna
Cap Corse Capo Corso (the Italian form being the original)
Carcassonne Carcassona (old), Carcassone, Carcasciona, Carcassonne (Italian pronunciation)
Cargèse Cargese (the Italian form being the original)
Carpentras Carpentrasso or Carpentorato
Castelsarrasin Castel Sarassino
Castres Castro
Caudebec (Caudebec-en-Caux) Caldabecca
Caur Calete
Cavaillon Cavaglione
Cévennes Cevenne
Chablais Chiablese, Ciablese / Sciablese
Chalon-sur-Saône Cialone sulla Saona / Scialone / Celona in Borgogna / [Cabilone] (old)
Châlons-en-Champagne Cialone sulla Marna / Scialona, Scialone / Cialona / [Catalauno] (old) 
Chambéry Sciamberì or Ciamberì (hist.)
Champagne Sciampagna (old)
Charente Caranta / Sciarenta (old)
Charolais Carolese
Charolles Sciarolla
Chartres Sciartre, Ciartre / Sciartra, Carnuto (old)
Chartreuse Certosa
Châteaubriant Castel Briante
Châteaudun Castelduno / Castelloduno (old)
Châtellerault Castellaraldo, Castell' Araldo
Chaumont Calcemonte
Cherbourg Cerburgo, Scierborgo, Caroborgo (old)
Chinon Chinone, Scinon
Cholet Coleto / Cauleto (old)
Clamecy Clamessi, Clamiaco
Clermont-Ferrand Chiermonte, Clermonte, Chiaromonte or Chiaramonte -Ferrante / [Chiarmonferrando] (old)
Cligny Cligni
Cognac Cognacco (old)
Colmar Colmaria, Columbaria (old)
Combeaufontaine Combofontana (old)
Comminges Comminge
Compiègne Compigno / Compendio (old)
Comtat Venaissin Contado Venassino
Condom Condomio, Condonio / Condomo (old)
Corbière Corbare
Cornouailles Cornovaglia
Corsica (French Corse) Corsica
Côte-d'Azur Costa Azzurra
Côte-d'Or Costa d'Oro
Coulommiers Colombiera / La Colombaria (old)
Coutances Cutanza
Craon Craone, Craonio
Crech Cresci
Dauphiné Delfinato
Dax Acque / Dacia / Acquense (old)
Die Dia
Dieppe Dieppa
Digne-les-Bains Digno delle Terme / Digna
Dijon Digione
Dinan Dinante
Dole Dola
Dombes Dombe
Donzère Donzera
Dordogne Dordogna
Douai Doaggio
Draguignan Draghignano
Dreux Droge, Droco / Durocassio (hist.)
Drôme Droma
Dunquerque Duncherche, Duncherque
Durance Duranza, Druenza
Elbeuf Elbovio (old)
Embrun Ambrone / Ambruno / Ebroduno, Embruno (old)
Épernay Sparnaco (old)
Épinal Spinale
Escaut Schelda
Essonne Esonna
Étampes Stampa (old)
Eure Eura, Ebura
Évreux Ebroica (old)
Falaise Falesia, Falesa (old)
Fargeau Fargeoli
Faucigny Fossigni
Fayence Favenza, Faianza (old)
Fismes Fima
Foix Fois, Foro, Fusso (old)
Fontainebleau Fontaneblo, Fontenblo, Fontanablò (old)
Forcalquier Forcalcario, Forcalchieri
Forez Forese
Fougères Fogera (old)
Franche-Comté Franca Contea
Fréjus Frejo, Frejulo, Foro di Giulio [rare] / Fregiù (old)
Frontignan Frontignano
Galéria Galeria
Gap Gape, Gapo
Gard Gardo, Vardo
Garonne Garonna
Gascony Guascogna
Gâtinais Gatinese, Guastinese
Gers Gerso
Gévaudan Gevodano, Gabalitano (old)
Gex Gesio
Gironde Gironda
Gisors Gisorzio
Glandeves Glandeva
Graisivaudan Gresivodano
Grasse Grassa
Grenoble Granopoli, / Grazianopoli (old)
Guadeloupe Guadalupa
Guerche Guerscia
Golfe du Lion Golfo del Leone
Guyenne Guienna, Ghienna
Hennebon Hennebono
Houlme Holmia
Hyères Iera
Île-de-France Isola di Francia
Ille-et-Vilaine Ille e Villena
Isère Isera, Issara
Issoudun Issolduno
Joinville Gienvilla
Labourd Laburdo
Landes Lande
Landun Lauduno
Langeac Langiaco
Langres Langra, Lingone (old)
Languedoc-Roussillon Linguadoca-Rossiglione
Laon Laone
La Rochelle La Roccella, La Roccelle
Laval Lavalle
Lavaur Lavauro
Lectoure Lettora (old)
Le Havre Avro di Grazia (old)
Le Mans Mansa, Cenomano, Mano [rare]
Lens Lenza (old)
Le Puy Podio / Poi / Poggio (old)
Libourne Liborno / Liburno / Linborno (old)
Lille Lilla
Limagne Limagna
Limoges Limoge
Limousin Limosino
L'Île-Rousse Isolarossa (the Italian form being the original)
Lisieux Lisobia, Lesovio (old)
Lodève Lodeva
Loire Loira, Lora
Longwy Lungovico / Longovico (old)
Lons-le-Saunier Ledone Salinario / Ledone Salinaro (old)
Lorraine Lorena
Loudun Luduno
Lozère Lozera
Luberon Leberone
Lude Ludo
Lure Ludera / Lura / Ludra (old)
Luxeuil Lussovio (old)
Lyon Lione
Lyonnais Lionese
Mâcon Macone, Mascone / Maconne / Matiscona (old)
Mâconnais Maconese, Masconese
Maine Mania, Maiese, Maini
Maine-et-Loire [dep.] Maina e Loira
Manche Manica
Manosque Manosca, Manesco or Manosco
Mantes Manta or Mante 
Marche Marca
Marmande Marmanda
Marne Marna
Marseille Marsiglia
Martinique Martinica
Marvejols Marvegio
Massif Central Massiccio Centrale
Maubeuge Mauboge
Mauriac Mauriaca
Maurienne Moriana (hist.)
Mayenne Maienna
Meaux Meldi (old)
Médoc Medoco, Medocche, Medolico
Melun Meluno (old)
Mende Menda
Menton Mentone (the Italian form being the original)
Metz Meta, Mes
Millau Amilliavo (very old)
Mirande Miranda or Meranda
Mirebeau Mirabella
Mirecourt Miracorte
Mirepoix Mirapinca (old)
Moïta Moita (the Italian form being the original)
Montargis Montargì (old)
Montauban Montalbano / Montealbano / Montelbano
Montbard Monte Bardo (old)
Montbéliard Monbeliardo, Monte Belicardo (old)
Mont-de-Marsan Monte Marsano
Montélimar Montelimare / Montiglio a mare (old)
Montereau Monasteriolo (old)
Montluçon Monte Lussone / Monlussone
Montmirail Montemiraglio
Montpellier Monpellieri, Monpeglieri / Monpolieri, Monpegliere / Mompeglieri (old)
Mont Ventoux Monte Ventoso
Morbihan Morbiano
Morlaix Morlasso (old)
Morvan Morvando
Moselle Mosella
Nancy Nanci, Nansi / Nancea (old)
Nantes Nante / Nanta / Nannete (old)
Narbonne Narbona
Navarrenx Navarrino
Nemours Nemosio
Nevers Niverno
Nice Nizza, Nizza Marittima (the Italian form being the original)
Niçois Nizzardo
Nievre Niva
Nîmes Nimme, Nisma / Nimissi / Nimese / Nemauso (old)
Niort Niorto, Noviorito (old)
Nivernais Nivernese
Normandie Normandia
Noyon Noione 
Nunts Nuzio
Nyons Nione (old)
Oise Oisa
Oloron-Sainte-Marie Olerone
Orange Orangia, Arausione / Aurenga (old)
Orchies Orchesio
Orléans Orleano / Aureliano (old)
Orléanais Orleanese
Orthez Ortesio
Palois Palomese
Pamiers Pamiero / Apamea (old)
Paris Parigi
Parisien Parigino
Pau Palo
Pays-de-Caux Calchese
Peaux-Rouges Pelli Rossi
Perche Percese, Pertica
Périgord Perigordia, Petrocoria
Périgueux Petrogorio
Peronne Perona
Perpignan Perpignano
Picardie Piccardia
Poitevin Pittovano
Poissy Poassi
Poitiers Potieri, Pittieri / Pottieri (old)
Poitou Poatù, / Poitù, Pittavia
Pons Ponte
Pont-de-l'Arche Ponte dell'Arca
Ponthieu Pontivia
Pontoise Pontosa, Pontisara (old)
Privas Privato
Provence Provenza
Provins Provino, Pruvino (old)
Pujoles Puggiolo
Pyrenees Pirenei
Quercy Querci, Cadurcia
Quesnoy Querceto
Quimper Quimpero
Rambouillet Rambuglietto (old)
Reims Remi / Remisi (old)
Remiremont Romarimonte, Monte Romarico (old)
Remois Remese
Rennais Rennese
Rennes Renna, Renne / Redona (old)
Rhodez Rodesia
Rhône Rodano
Ribemont Ribemonte
Rieux Rivi (old)
Roanne Roana, Rodone (old)
Romans Romano
Romorantin-Lanthenay Castel Romorantino (old)
Roquebrune Roccabruna (the Italian form being the original)
Roubaix Rubaci
Rouen Roano
Rouergue Roverga, Rutenico [hist.]
Roussillon Rossiglione, Catalogna del Nord
Saint-Brieuc San Brioco (old)
Saint-Denys San Dionisio
Saint-Dizier San Desiderio
Saint-Étienne Santo Stefano
Saint-Florent San Fiorenzo (the Italian form being the original)
Saint-Flour San Floro
Saint-Ligier San Lizerio
Saint-Lô San Lo, Santo Lo
Saint-Malo San Malo
Saint-Nazaire San Nazaro, San Nazario
Saint-Omer Sant'Omero
Saint-Quentin San Quintino (historical)
Saint-Tropez San Torpe
Saintes Santes / Santi (old)
Saintonge Santongia, Santonia / Santonico (old)
Sarlat-la-Canéda Sarlato
Sartène Sartena (the Italian form being the original)
Seine Senna
Saône Saona
Saulieu Salvoloco, Salvoluogo / Sedeloco (old)
Saumur Salmuro / Salmure, Salmore (old)
Savoie Savoia
Senlis Silvanetto (old)
Sens Senone, Seno
Sisteron Sisterone
Soissons Soassone, Suassone / Soissone (old)
Sologne Sologna
Sombernon Sombernone
Strasbourg Strasburgo / Argentina (old)
Tarascon Tarascona
Tarentaise Tarantasia, [Tarentasia]
Tarbes Tarba, Tarbe, Turba / Turbia (old)
Territoire de Belfort Territorio di Belforte
Therouanne Teruana, Tarvenna (old)
Thierache Tiraccia
Thouars Toarcio / Toarco (old)
Tonnerre Tonnero / Tornodero [rare]
Toul Tulo
Toulon Tolone
Toulouse Tolosa
Touraine Turenna
Tournon Tornone (old)
Tours Turse, Turone / Torso
Tox Tocchisi (old)
Troyes Tresetto (old)
Tulle Tulla / Tutela (old)
Vaison-la-Romaine Vaisone
Valence Valenza nel Delfinato
Valenciennes Valenziana, Valenzino / Valenziano (old)
Valenciennois Valenzianese
Valentinois Valentinese
Valois Valese
Vannes Vanna / Venne (old)
Varennes Varenne 
Vaucluse Valchiusa
Velay Velesia
Vence Venza
Vendée Vendea or Vandea
Vendôme Vendoma or Vandomino, Vendomo, Vendosmo (old) / Vindocino (rare)
Mont Ventoux Monte Ventoso
Verdèse Verdese (the Italian form being the original)
Verdun Verduno or Veroduno / Verdunno (old)
Vermandois Vermandua
Vernon Vernone
Versailles Versaglia (old)
Vervins Verbino / Vervino (old)
Vesoul Vesula, Vesulo / Vesolo (old)
Vienne Vienna del Delfinato (old)
Vire Vira
Vivarais Vivarese
Viviers Vivierse
Wissant Guizzante (old)
Yonne Jonna
Yssingeaux Issengio (old)

Nice
All these names were officially used until 1861, because the County of Nice was part of the Kingdom of Sardinia, an Italian State. In 1861 the County passed to France.

Ascros Ascroso, Scroso
Aspremont Aspromonte di Nizza
Auvare Auvara
Bairols Bairolo
Beaulieu-sur-Mer Belluogo
Beausoleil Belsole
Belvédère Belvedere
Bendejun Bendigiuno, Bendegiuno
Berre-les-Alpes Berra, Berre dell'Alpi, Bera
Beuil Boglio, Boglio Montano
Blausasc Bleusasco, Blausasco
Bonson Bonsone, Bausone
Breil-sur-Roya Breglio, Breglio sul Roia
Cantaron Cantarone
Cap-d'Ail Capodaglio, Capo d'Aglio, Capo d'Aggio
Castagniers Castagnera, Castagneto
Castellar Castellaro, Castellaro di Mentone
Castillon Castiglione, Castiglione di Mentone
Châteauneuf-d'Entraunes Castelnuovo d'Entraune, Castelnuovo d'Entrone
Châteauneuf-Villevieille Castelnuovo-Villavecchia
Clans Clanzo, Clanso, Clanzio
Coaraze Coarazza, Coarasa
Colomars Colombar del Varo, Colomarte, Colombare
Contes Conte, Conti
Cuébris Cuebri, Cuebris, Quebris
Daluis Dàlui, Daluigi
Drap Drappo, Drapo
Duranus Durano*, Duranuzzo, Duranusso
Entraunes Entraune, Entrone
Èze Eza, Esa
Falicon Falicone
Fontan Fontano
Gilette Giletta
Gorbio Gorbio
Guillaumes Guglielmi
Ilonse Ilonza, Illonza
Isola Isola nel Mercantore, Isola delle Cascate
La Bollène-Vésubie Bollena, Bolena
La Brigue Briga Marittima, Briga
La Croix-sur-Roudoule La Croce sul Rodola
La Roquette-sur-Var Rocchetta del Varo
L'Escarène Scarena
Lantosque Lantosca
La Penne La Penna
La Trinité Trinità, Trinità Vittoria, Trinità Vittorio
La Tour La Torre
La Turbie Turbia, La Turbia
Levens Levenzo, Levenso
Lieuche Lieucia, Liuchia, Leuca
Lucéram Lucerame, Luceramo, Lucera Nizzarda
Malaussène Malaussena, Magliassene
Marie Maria
Massoins Massoino, Maissone, Massoine
Moulinet Molinetto
Peille Peglia, Peglio di Nizza
Peillon Peglione
Péone Peona
Pierlas Pierlasso, Pietralasso, Pietralassa, (Pierlazzo)
Pierrefeu Pietrafuoco, Pietrafoco
Puget-Rostang Poggetto Rostagno, Poggetto Rostagni
Puget-Théniers Poggetto Tenieri, Poggetto sul Varo
Revest-les-Roches Revesto
Rigaud Rigaudo, Rigaldo
Rimplas Rimplasso, Reimplasso, Rimpiazzo d'Ilonza
Roquebillière Roccabigliera
Roquebrune-Cap-Martin Roccabruna sul Capo Martino
Roquesteron Roccasterone
Roubion Robione, Robbione
Roure Rorà
Saint-André-de-la-Roche Sant'Andrea di Nizza
Saint-Antonin Sant'Antonino
Saint-Blaise San Biagio di Nizza
Saint-Dalmas-le-Selvage San Dalmazzo il Selvatico, San Dalmazzo Selvaggio
Sainte-Agnès Sant'Agnese
Saint-Étienne-de-Tinée Santo Stefano di Tinea
Saint-Jean-Cap-Ferrat San Giovanni Capoferrato
Saint-Léger San Laugerio, San Leggero
Saint-Martin-d'Entraunes San Martino d'Entraune, San Martino d'Entrone
Saint-Martin-du-Var San Martino del Varo
Saint-Martin-Vésubie San Martino Lantosca, San Martino Vesubia
Saint-Sauveur-sur-Tinée San Salvatore di Tinea
Sauze Salice, Sause, Salici
Saorge Saorgio
Sigale Cigalla, Cigala, Sigalla
Sospel Sospello
Tende Tenda
Thiéry Tieri
Toudon Todone
Touët-de-l'Escarène Toetto-Scarena
Touët-sur-Var Toetto di Boglio, Toetto sul Varo
Tourette-du-Château La Torretta
Tourrette-Levens Torretta Levenzo, Torrette Chiabaudi
Tournefort Tornaforte
Utelle Utello, Utelle, Utella, Uteglia
Valdeblore Valdiblora
Venanson Venanzone, Venansone
Villefranche-sur-Mer Villafranca, Villafranca Marittima, Villafranca sul mare
Villeneuve-d'Entraunes Villanova d'Entraune, Villanuova d'Entrone
Villars-sur-Var Villar del Varo, Villare del Varo

Grasse

Aiglun Aigluno
Amirat Ammirato
Andon Andone
Antibes Antibo or Antipoli
Auribeau-sur-Siagne Auribello
Bézaudun-les-Alpes Besalduno
Biot Biotto
Bouyon Boione
Briançonnet Brianzonetto
Cabris Cabri
Cagnes-sur-Mer Cagna, Cagno Ligure
Caille Caglia
Cannes Canna, Canne
Carros Carrosio
Caussols Caussole
Châteauneuf-Grasse Castelnuovo di Grassa
Cipières Cippiera
Collongues Coalunga, Cologna
Conségudes Consecuta
Courmes Corma, Cormi
Coursegoules Corsegola
Escragnolles Scragnola
Gars Garzo
Gattières Gattiera
Gourdon Gordone
Grasse Grassa
Gréolières Greoliera*, Agrioleri, Grisolia
La Colle-sur-Loup Colla, La Colla
La Gaude La Gauda
La Roque-en-Provence Rocca
La Roquette-sur-Siagne Rocchetta sulla Ciagna
Le Bar-sur-Loup Albarno
Le Broc Brocco or Brocca
Le Cannet Canneto or il Caneto
Le Mas Masio
Le Rouret Roreto or Rovereto
Le Tignet Tignetto
Les Ferres Ferre, Ferri
Les Mujouls Moggioli
Mandelieu-la-Napoule Mandaloco-la Napola
Mouans-Sartoux Moano Sartole*, Murziani-Sarti
Mougins Mogino*, Mugini
Opio Oppia
Pégomas Pegomasso
Peymeinade Peimenada*, Poggio Mainata
Roquefort-les-Pins Roccaforte dei Pini
Saint-Auban Sant'Albano sull'Esterone
Saint-Cézaire-sur-Siagne San Cesario
Saint-Jeannet San Giannetto
Saint-Laurent-du-Var San Lorenzo sul Varo
Saint-Paul-de-Vence San Paolo di Venza
Saint-Vallier-de-Thiey San Valerio
Sallagriffon Salagrifone, Sallagriffone
Séranon Seranone
Spéracèdes Speiraceta
Théoule-sur-Mer Teola, Teula, Tegola
Tourrettes-sur-Loup Torretta di Venza
Valbonne Valbona
Valderoure Val di Rora, Valdirora
Vallauris Vallauria, Valloria
Vence Venza
Villeneuve-Loubet Villanova Lobetto*, Villanuova Lopetto

Historical parts

Annot Annotta, Annoto
Aurent Aurenco
Braux Brauso
Castellet-les-Sausses Castelletto Salza
Castellet-Saint-Cassien Castelletto San Cassiano
Entrevaux Entrovalli, Entrevàuso
la Rochette Rocchetta
le Fugeret Felceto
Méailles Meaglia
Peyresq Peiresco
Saint-Benoît San Benedetto
Sausses Salza
Ubraye Ubraia or Ubraja
Val-de-Chalvagne Val di Chiavagna
Villevieille Cittavecchia di Entrevàuso, Villavecchia

Aosta Valley
fr. Vallée d'Aoste – it. Valle d'Aosta:
[Italian names to 1861], /1924–1928/, (1939–1947)

Under Mussolini, a forced program of Italianization that included the translation of all toponyms into Italian occurred. As the region gained special autonomous status after the end of World War Two; the province of Aosta ceased to exist in 1945 and all the original French toponyms were reestablished as all the Italian ones were abolished, except from Aosta (co-official with the French Aoste).

Allein [...], /Agliene d'Aosta/, (Alleno, Alliano)
Antey-Saint-André [Antei], /Antei/, (Antei Sant'Andrea)
Aoste – Aosta
Arnad [...], /Arnado/, (Arnado, Arnaz)
Arvier [Arviere], /Arviere/, (Arviero, Arverio, Arvie)
Avise [...], /.../, (Aviso, Avisia)
Ayas [...], /Ajas/, (Aias, Aiassa, Aiazzo)
Aymavilles [Aimavilla], /Aimaville/, (Aimavilla, Aimavilia)
Bard [Bardo], /Bardo d'Aosta/, (Bardo)
Bionaz [Bionazzo], /Bionazzo/, (Biona)
Brissogne [...], /.../, (Brissogno)
Brusson [...], /Bruzzone/, (Brussone)
Challand-Saint-Anselme [...], /.../, (Villa Sant'Anselmo)
Challand-Saint-Victor [...], /.../, (Villa San Vittorio, Villa San Vittore)
Chambave [Ciambava], /Ciambava/, (Ciambave, Cambavia)
Chamois [Ciamese], /Ciamese/, (Camoscio, Camosio)
Champdepraz [...], /Campo di Prazzo/, (Campodiprati)
Champorcher [Camporciero, Campo Porcaro], /.../, (Campo Laris)
Charvensod [...], /.../, (Carvenso, Carvensolo, Campo Mussolini)
Châtillon [Ciatiglione], /Castiglion Dora/, (Castiglione Dora)
Cogne [...], /.../, (Cogno)
Courmayeur [Cortemaggiore, Cormaggiore], /Cortemaggiore o Cormaggiore d'Aosta/, (Cormaiore)
Donnas [Donnazzo], /Donna/, (Donnaz, Donas)
Doues [Dove], /Dué/, (Dovia d'Aosta, Dovia di Aosta, Dovesia)
Emarèse [...], /.../, (Emarese)
Étroubles [Estroble], /Ettruglie/, (Etroble, Stipule)
Fontainemore [...], /.../, (Fontanamora)
Fénis [...], /.../, (Fenisso, Fenice)
Gaby [...], /.../, (Gabi, Gabbio)
Gignod [Gignodo], /Gignodo/, (Gigno, Gignolo)
Gressan [...], /Grecciano/, (Gressano)
Gressoney-La-Trinité [Gressonei], /Gressonei/, (Gressonei La Trinità)
Gressoney-Saint-Jean [Gressonei], /Gressonei/, (Gressonei San Giovanni)
Hône [Ona], /One/, (Ono)
Introd [Introdo], /Introdo/, (Introdo)
Issime [...], /.../, (Issimo, Issime)
Issogne [...], /.../, (Issogno)
Jovençan [Giovenzano], /Giovinazzo d'Aosta/, (Giovencano, Giovenzano)
La Magdeleine [...], /La Maddalena d'Aosta/, (La maddalena d'Aosta, Antei La Maddalena)
La Salle [...], /.../, (Sala Dora)
La Thuile [La Tuila], /La Tegola/, (Porta Littoria, Tuillia)
Lillianes [Lilliane], /Ligliano/, (Liliana, Lilliana)
Montjovet [...], /Montegiove d'Aosta/, (Mongiove)
Morgex [Morgezzo], /Morgesso/, (Valdigna d'Aosta)
Nus [Nusso], /Nuzzo/, (Noce di Aosta)
Ollomont [Olomonte], /.../, (Ollomonte)
Oyace [Ojace], /.../, (Oiasse, Ojace)
Perloz [...], /Perlo'/, (Perlozzo)
Pollein [...], /Poglieno/, (Polleno, Pollano)
Pont-Saint-Martin [...], /Ponte di San Martino/, (Ponte San Martino)
Pontboset [...], /Ponte del Duca d'Aosta/, (Pianboseto, Ponboseto)
Pontey [Pontei], /Pontei/, (Pontesano, Pontei)
Pré-Saint-Didier [...], /Prezzo di Savoia/, (San Desiderio Terme, Prato San Desiderio)
Quart [Quarto], /Quarto d'Aosta/, (Quarto Pretoria, Quarto Praetoria)
Rhêmes-Notre-Dame [...], /Vittorio Nostra Signora/, (Nostra Signora di Rema, Val di Rema di Sotto, Madonna di Rema)
Rhêmes-Saint-Georges [...], /Vittorio San Giorgio/, (San Giorgio di Rema, Val di Rema di Sopra)
Roisan [...], /Rossano del Monte/, (Roisano, Rosano)
Saint-Christophe [...], /San Cristoforo Vittorio/, (San Cristoforo)
Saint-Denis [...], /San Denizzo/, (San Dionigi)
Saint-Marcel [...], /San Marcello d'Aosta/, (San Marcello)
Saint-Nicolas [...], /San Nicola d'Aosta/, (San Nicola)
Saint-Oyen [...], /Sant, Oglieno/, (Sant'Eugenio, Santo Eugendo, Sant'Ogendo)
Saint-Pierre [...], /San Pietro Latino/, (San Pietro, San Pietro e Paolo)
Saint-Rhémy [...], /.../, (San Remigio)
Saint-Vincent [...], /San Vincenzo/, (San Vincenzo della Fonte)
Sarre [...], /.../, (Sarra)
Torgnon [...], /Torgnone/, (Torgnone, Tornione)
Valgrisenche [Val Grisanza], /Valgrisenze/, (Valgrisenza)
Valpelline [Valpellina], /Valpellina/, (Valpellina)
Valsavarenche [...], /Val Savarance/, (Valsavara)
Valtournenche [Val Tornenza], /Valturnezze/, (Valtornenza, Val Tornenza)
Verrayes [...], /.../, (Verraio, Verraglie)
Verrès [Verrezzo], /Castelverres/, (Castel Verres)
Villeneuve [...], /Villanova de' Monti/, (Villanova Baltea)

Georgia

Germany

Ghana

Greece

Guatemala

Hungary

India

Indonesia

Iraq

Ireland

Israel

Latvia

Lebanon

Libya

Lithuania

Luxemburg

Malta
Italian was Malta's official language until 1934.

Mexico

Montenegro
All these names were used by the Italian autochthonous population and by Venetian Republic

Morocco

Netherlands

New Zealand

North Macedonia

Oman

Palestine

Poland

Portugal

Romania

Russia

Saudi Arabia

Serbia

Slovakia

Slovenia

Somalia

South Africa

South Korea

Spain

Sweden

Switzerland
Italian is one of the four official languages in Switzerland.

Canton of the Grisons
Historical Italian Names of the Municipalities in the Canton Grisons (ital. Cantone dei Grigioni)
-[This material is taken from the book: ,,I Principali toponimi della Rezia curiense,,_Aurelio Garobbio_(autor)_/1941/- these names are marked with_*]-

Almens Lumine*, Almenno
Alvaneu Alvagnè*, Alvignino or Alvegnino
Alvaneubad Bagni d'Alvagnè*, Bagno d'Alvignino or Bagno d'Alvegnino
Alvaschein Alvascino*, Alvesagno
Andeer Andero*, Andera
Andest Andeste*, Andesto
Ardez Ardezzo, Ardez*
Arosa Arosa
Avers Àvero*, Avra
Beiva Bivio
Bergün Borgogno*, Bergogno
Bevers Bevero
Bonaduz Panadosso or Beneduzzo, Bonaduz*
Brienz Brienzola*
Breil/Brigels Brigeglio, Brigello*
Buchen im Prättigau Fàggio*, Faggeto in Prettigovia
Calfreisen Cafràssino
Camuns Ca'dei Monti*, Camonzo
Casti-Wergenstein Castello_(Casti Sessame*)-Vergasteno* 
Castiel Castello, Castel Scanavica*
Castrisch Càstrice*
Cazis Cassi or Cassis, Càzas*
Celerina Cellerina or Celerina
Champfer Campofare
Chur Coira
Churwalden Corvànzia*, Corvalda
Clugin Clugino*, Chiugino
Conters im Oberhalbstein Contra, Cuntèr di Sursette*
Conters im Prättigau Contra in Prettigovia, Cuntèr di Partenzo*
Cumbel Combello*
Dalin Dalino
Davos Tavate
Davos Platz Tavate Piazza*
Disentis/Mustér Desertina* or Tisitis
Domat/Ems Damede or Damet, Dòmat*
Donath Anede or Donato, Donat*
Duvin Dovino or Duvin*
Fanas Fanasio, Fànas*
Feldis Felda*, Foldaone or Velda
Falera Falera*, Fallera
Felsberg Favogno* or Villa Fagonio
Ferrera = Ferrera:
Ausserferrera Ferrera di Fuori, Ferrera d'Àvero*
Innerferrera Ferrera di Dentro, Calangìl*
Fideris Fidrisio
Filisur Villasura*, Felisorre
Fläsch Flasce*, Fiasca
Flerden Flerda
Flims Flemo, Fleme*
Flond Flondo*
Ftan Fetanno or Fettano
Fuldera Fuldera
Furna Furna*
Fürstenau Maiòria*, Firstinao
Grüsch Croce in Prettigovia, Croce di Partenzo* or Crusca
Guarda Guarda*
Haldenstein Lanze di Sotto*
Hinterrhein Valdireno or San Pietro Valreno*
Igels Egene, _Dègen*
Igis Egino, _Èigias*
Ilanz Ilonte or Iante*, Ilanza
Jenaz Gianazzo*, Giovanaccio or Giovannaccio
Jenins Gianino, Genine*
Kästris Castrisio
Klosters-Serneus Claustra* or Chiostro / C.-Cernèus*
Küblis Cupelina*, Cubliaso or Convalle
Laax Laghi, Lages*
Ladir Ladiro
Landquart Langaro*
Langwies Pralongo* or Pralungo
Lantsch Lanze di Sopra*, Lanzo
Lavin Lavino, Lavina*
Lenzerheide Planèira*
Lohn Laone or Lon*
Lü Luio or Lü
Lüen Leune*
Lumbrein Lamarene* or Lumarene
Luven Loveno or Luvene*
Luzein Luciano*, Luceina or Lucigno
Madulein Maduleno*, Madulene
Maienfeld Maiavilla or Maggiavilla
Maladers Maladro, Maladre*
Malans Malanza or Malànzia*
Malix Umbligo or Umbelico, Umblies*
Maloja Maloggia
Marmorera Marmorera
Martina Pommartina, Ponte Martina*
Masans Mezzane
Masein Masene*, Medezeno or Masagno
Mastrils Monasteriolo*
Mathon Matone or Màton*
Medels im Oberland Medèl in Surselva*
Medels im Rheinwald Medèl in Valreno* 
Meierhof Corte Maiòria*, Cortemaggiore
Molinis Molina di Scanavica*, Molini
Mons Monno or Mons*
Morissen Muricia*, Morissa
Mulegns Molini di Sursette*
Müstair Monastero di Tubre*
Mutten Monte or Motta*, Mutta
Nufenen Novena
Obersaxen Sursasso* or Soprasasso
Pagig Pagigo*, Puigo
Panix Pignono, Pignìu*
Parpan Parpano*, Parpanno
Paspels Pasquale*
Patzen-Fardün Pàzeno-Faldone/Fardeno*
Peiden San Pietro di Lunganezza*, Peida
Peist Peste, Paiste*
Pignia Pignia*, Pignigo
Pitasch Pitàccio*
Pontresina Pontresina*
Portein Porteno*, Purtino
Praden Prada*, Prata or Prati
Pratval Pratavalle*, Prato del Valle
Parsonz Prasanzo*, Presanzo
Präz Prezio or Parezzo*
La Punt Chamues-ch Ponte Campovasto
Ramosch Ramoggia, Ramoscio*
Reischen Reseno*
Riom Riamio*
Reichenau Ponte or la Punt*
Rhäzüns Razeno, Razene* or Ronzone
Riein Renio*
Rodels Roteno, Rotene*
Rona Rona or Rovena, Rovina*
Rongellen Roncaglia, Roncàlia*
Rothenbrunnen Fontana Rossa, Juvalta*
Ruis Ruane*, Roano or Rovano
Ruschein Rusene*
Saas im Prättigau Sàlice di Partenzo*, Sausa
Safien-Platz Piazza Stossavia
Safiental Stossavia or Val Stossavia
Sagogn Sagogno or Sagagno
Salouf Salucco, Salugo*
Samaden Samedano or Samada
Samnaun Samignone
Sankt Antönien-Ascharina Acerina di Sant'Antonio*
Sankt Antönien-Castels Castel Sant'Antonio*
Sankt Antönien-Rüti Ronco di Sant'Antonio*
Sankt Martin_(Lugnez) San Martino di Lunganezza*
Sankt Moritz San Maurizio d'Engadina
Sankt Peter San Pietro di Scanavica*
Santa Maria Val Müstair Santa Maria in Val Monastero
Sarn Sarno*
Savognin Savognino
Says Sèio*
S-chanf Scanevo or Scanfio, Scanfo*
Scharans Cerrone*, Gironzio
Scheid Scèdio*
Schiers Àcera*, Acereto
Schlans Selauno, Selane*
Schluein Slovegno, Sluenio*
Schnaus Sinaus*
Schuders Scudero
Schmitten Ferrera d'Albula*
Sculms Scolmo
Scuol Scolio
Sedruns Sedrone
Sevgein Sevigene* or Savienno, Sevino*
Seewis im Prättigau Sievia, Sevisio in Prettigovia or Sequìgia*
Sent Sento
Seth Sette*
S-charl Scarlo or Scarli
Sils im Domleschg Siglio in Domigliasca or Segli in Domigliasca*
Sils im Engadin Siglio in Engadina or Sèglio d'Engadina*
Silvaplana Selvapiana or Silvapiana
Somvix Sommovico* or Sonvico
Splügen Spluga
Stierva Stirvia or Stierva*
Sufers Suverio, Sur in Valreno*
Sur Sora or Sur d'Albula*
Surava Sorava
Surcasti Surcastello* or Sur Castello*
Surcuolm Surcolma*
Susch Susio, Susa*
Tamins Tumegno or Tamino*
Tarasp Taraspo or Taraspa*
Tartar Tartaro*
Tenna Tenna*
Tersnaus Terzinasso*
Thusis Tosanna or Tosana
Tiefencastel Castino or Imocastello / (Castelfondo)*
Tinizong Tinizzone, Tinezone* , Tinizugno
Tomils Tomiglio, Domìglio*
Trans Trano or Tràunes*
Trimmis Trèmine*, Trimmo
Trin Turunnio or Turunio, Trino
Trun Tronte*
Tschappina Ciappina*, Ceppina
Tschiertschen Circello*, Cerceno or Cercene
Tschierv Cervo*, Cervi
Tschlin Cellino or Celino, Celine*
Tujetsch Tovieggio, Tavèccio*
Untervaz Vazze di Sotto*
Uors Biforco*, Furze
Urmein Urmeno*, Urmino
Valchava Valcava
Valendas Valendano*
Vals Valle San Pietro, San Pietro in Valle*
Valzeina Valsèina*
Vaz/Obervaz Vazze di Sopra*
Vazerol Visarolo
Vella Villa*
Versam Versomma or Fersamio, Versomi*
Vignogn Vigogno, Vignone*
Vnà Manà*
Vrin Varino or Vrino, Aurino, Vrin*
Waltensburg Vurze*, Vuorze, Vurce* or Vorce*
Weinberg Ovella*
Wiesen Tèin* or Tegno
Zernez Cernezzo
Zillis Zirano or Cirano, Cirane*, Cerano
Zizers Zìzure*, Zizero or Cicero
Zuoz Zozzio

Syria

Tunisia

Turkey

Ukraine

United Kingdom

United States

Vietnam

Unsorted

Carpathian Mountains Monti Carpazi
Ceraunian Mountains Monti Acrocerauni (Albania)
Danube Danubio
Elbe Elba (Czech Republic, Germany, Poland)
Euskadi: Paesi Baschi (France)
English Channel: La Manica (England, France)
Frisian Islands Isole Frisone (Denmark, Germany, Netherlands)
Krkonoše Monti dei Giganti (Czech Republic, Poland)
Lapland Lapponia (Sweden)
Lausitz/Łužyca/Łużyce/Lužice Lusazia (Czech Republic, Germany, Poland)
Meuse/Maas: Mosa (Belgium, France, Netherlands)
Ore Mountains Monti Metalliferi (Czech Republic, Germany)
Pyrenees: Pirenei (France, Spain)
Rhine Reno (Netherlands, Switzerland)
Saint George's Channel Canale San Giorgio (Ireland, United Kingdom)
Scheldt Schelda (Belgium, France, Netherlands)
Tauern Monti Tauri (Austria)

See also
 List of European exonyms

References

 
Exonym
Lists of exonyms